Gerstmann:
 Jeff Gerstmann, an American video game journalist and musician
 Josef Gerstmann, an Austrian neurologist
 Gerstmann syndrome, a neuropsychological disorder
 Gerstmann–Sträussler–Scheinker syndrome, a very rare fatal neurodegenerative disease

German-language surnames
Jewish surnames